Charles Doyle may refer to:

 Charles Hastings Doyle (1804–1883), British soldier and Lieutenant Governor of Nova Scotia and New Brunswick
 Charles Altamont Doyle (1832–1893), Victorian artist
 Charles William Doyle (1770–1842), British Army officer
 C. Andrew Doyle (born 1966), Bishop of Texas